Shenandoah High School is a public high school near Sarahsville, Ohio.  It is the only high school in the Noble Local School District.  Their nickname is the Zeps.

History
The school's construction was the result of the consolidation of area school districts.  Shenandoah High School opened in September 1963 with 390 students.  Ohio Congressman Robert T. Secrest gave the main address at the school's official dedication in November.

The school was named for the USS Shenandoah (ZR-1), a rigid airship which crashed in Noble County on September 2, 1925, which is also the source of their "Zeps" nickname.

Renovations to the school that added HVAC were completed in 2018.

Extracurricular activities

Their chief sports rivals are the Caldwell Redskins.

References

External links
 

Educational institutions established in 1963
High schools in Noble County, Ohio
Public high schools in Ohio
1963 establishments in Ohio